Pequeñeces (English title:Littleness) is a Mexican telenovela by Televisa for Telesistema Mexicano.

Sonia Furió starred as antagonistic protagonist with Joaquín Cordero and Adriana Roel starred as protagonists.

Cast 
Sonia Furió as Currita Albornoz de Luján
Joaquín Cordero as Jacopo Tellez
Adriana Roel as Elvira Covarrubias de Tellez
Norma Lazareno as Carmen Tagle
Antonio Raxel as Federico Lujan
Carlos Monden as Fernando

References

External links

Mexican telenovelas
1971 telenovelas
Televisa telenovelas
Spanish-language telenovelas
1971 Mexican television series debuts
1971 Mexican television series endings